Oliver Kelley may refer to:
 Oliver Hudson Kelley, co-founders of the National Grange of the Order of Patrons of Husbandry
 Oliver K. Kelley, American automotive engineer

See also
 Oliver Kelly, Roman Catholic archbishop